The Prairie View A&M Panthers basketball team is the men's basketball team that represents Prairie View A&M University in Prairie View, Texas, United States. The school's team currently competes in the Southwestern Athletic Conference (SWAC). PVAMU won the 1962 NAIA Tournament.

TSU basketball rivalry
The Prairie View A&M-Texas Southern basketball rivalry is the most anticipated and highest attended basketball series in the SWAC.  The February 2018 match up at Prairie View A&M saw a home crowd of approximately 4,000 which was the largest for the season.

Postseason results

NCAA tournament results
The Panthers have appeared twice in the NCAA tournament. Their record is 0–2.

NAIA Tournament results
The Panthers have appeared in one NAIA Tournament in which they were National Champions with a 5–0 record in 1962.

SWAC Tournament
The Prairie View A&M Panthers have won the SWAC Tournament in 1998 and 2019. The team has made several championship game appearances.

Hall of Famers
Prairie View A&M has a professional basketball hall of famer in their ranks.  Former Panther center Zelmo Beaty.  Beaty, was selected to be inducted into the 2014 National Collegiate Basketball Hall of Fame class and the 2016 Naismith Memorial Basketball Hall of Fame class.

"Zelmo Beaty played for Coach John Payton at Woodville's Scott High School and won back to back Prairie View Interscholastic League 1A state championships in 1957 & 1958. From 1958-1962 at Prairie View A&M Beaty averaged 25 points and 20 rebounds per game and was a two-time first team NAIA All-American (1960 & 1962). The "Big Z" led Prairie View A&M to the NAIA national basketball title in 1962 and was named the Chuck Taylor Tournament MVP. He was picked third overall by the St. Louis Hawks in the 1962 NBA Draft. A 6'9" center who was known for his tough, hard-nosed play he averaged 17.4 points and 11.2 rebounds in 7 seasons (1962-1969) for the St. Louis Hawks. He made the NBA All-Rookie first team and 2 All-Star Games before switching to the rival ABA's Utah Stars in 1970. Beaty led the Stars to the 1971 ABA title while averaging 22.9 points and 15.7 rebounds, and was named MVP of the playoffs. In Utah he averaged 19.1 points, 11.6 rebounds and was 3-time All-Star in 4 seasons (1970-1974). In He played his final NBA season with the Los Angeles Lakers in 1975. Beaty scored 15,207 points and had 9,665 rebounds during his 12-season professional career. He was named to the ABA's 30-man all-time team in 1997 and was inducted into the National Collegiate Basketball Hall of Fame 2014. Beaty died on August 27, 2013."

References

External links
Website